Paul McLawrin Antrobus (1935–2015) was a Canadian Baptist missionary who served in India between 1962 and 1969 through the Canadian Baptist Ministries.

Antrobus was much known as a psychology Professor at the Luther College at the University of Regina, Regina (Canada) where he taught from 1973 to 2005.

Studies
Antrobus schooled at the coastal town of Prince Rupert, British Columbia from where he joined the Brandon College, Brandon taking a B.A. in 1959.  As a graduate student of Brandon College, he participated as an active role in collegiate activities such as the college unit of Student Christian Movement, the Crests and Awards Board and the Zoology Laboratory.  After completing graduate studies in arts, Antrobus moved on to the McMaster University, Hamilton where he pursued a graduate course in theology leading to B.D. in 1962.

For doctoral studies, Antrobus enrolled at the University of Waterloo, Waterloo where he researched in psychology leading to the award of Ph.D. in 1973.

Career

Ecclesiastical
Antrobus was ordained as a Baptist Pastor in 1962 and left for India as an overseas missionary of the Canadian Baptist Ministries.  From 1966 to 1968, he served as the Principal of the Baptist Theological Seminary, Kakinada, succeeding Victor Hahn.

Psychology
After Antrobus completed doctoral studies in psychology in 1973 from the University of Waterloo, he began teaching psychology at the Luther College at the University of Regina, Regina (Canada), continuing until 2005.

See also
 List of University of Waterloo people

References

20th-century Canadian Baptist ministers
Baptist writers
Brandon University alumni
McMaster University alumni
University of Waterloo alumni
University of Regina
Telugu people
Christian clergy from Andhra Pradesh
Indian Christian theologians
Canadian Baptist Ministries missionaries in India
Academic staff of the Senate of Serampore College (University)
Convention of Baptist Churches of Northern Circars pastors
1935 births
2015 deaths